Happy End is a French film released in 2003. It was written and directed by Amos Kollek; starring Audrey Tautou, Justin Theroux, Jennifer Tilly and Jim Parsons.

Plot
The 23-year-old French woman Val Chipzik has many dreams. She travels to New York City to become an actress. There she does temporary jobs and sleeps in the front yard of the screenwriter Jack. With the money she earned, she pays for her continuing education in her dream job.

Jack is initially annoyed by Val, then she gives him the idea of a promising script. Jack falls in love with her and demands from the film people who want to shoot according to his script that he can help determine the leading actress to be cast.

Cast

 Audrey Tautou as Val Chipzik
 Justin Theroux as Jack
 Jennifer Tilly as Edna
 Laila Robins as Irene
 Jim Parsons as casting assistant

External links

French romantic comedy-drama films
2003 films
Films directed by Amos Kollek
2000s French films